Mansoor Aslam Khan Niazi, known professionally as Sami Khan, is a Pakistani actor and model who appears in films and television dramas. He started his career with film Salakhain and then moved to television.

Early life
He was born on July 6, 1980 in the Pakistani city of Lahore, he has studied at Divisional Public School and graduated as an Electronic & Communication engineer from UET in 2003, even though he did not work as one as he landed a role in a film.

His brother Taifoor Khan, a NCA graduate, is also an actor and model, while also being a musician who had his own successful band till 2008, Jadoo.

Career
Khan made his Lollywood debut in 2004 with Salakhain, where he portrayed the role of a young police officer named Mansoor. His debut drama serial was Dil se Dil Tak which was originally broadcast on PTV. Khan won the award for Best Actor in the 16th PTV awards ceremony, held on July 23, 2011 for drama serial Ghar Ki Khatir. He is also the recipient of the Tamgha-e-Imtiaz (which is the fourth highest civilian award), in the Performing Arts Category in 2012. He was also nominated for Best Actor at Lux Style Awards for his outstanding performance in drama series Main (2013).

In the first half of 2013, Khan appeared in the telefilm Devar Bhabhi directed by Sayed Noor. He played the role of Khalid, along with Saima Noor and Sadia Khan, a remake of the 1967 film of the same name. Khan won Best Actor (Leading Role) for Devar Bhabhi. He has also performed in the dramas Dil se Dil Tak, Sitam, Chaap, Angles, Apney Hue Paraye, Tootay Huay Par, Maaye-Ni and Me Gunehgar Nahi.

His notable work include Jinnah Ke Naam (2009), Gharr Ki Khatir (2010), Sirat e Mustaqeem (2012), Do Qadam Door Thay (2014), Piya Man Bhaye (2015), Dhaani (Geo TV) (2016), Rasm E Duniya (2017), Be Inteha (Serial) (2017), Toh Dil Ka Kia Hua (2017), Aisi Hai Tanhai (2017),  Khudgarz (2017) and Woh Mera Dil Tha (2018).

He is the recipient of Tarang Houseful award, PTV Award and Tamgha-e-Imtiaz.

In 2019, he starred in the romantic-comedy film Wrong No. 2 opposite Neelam Muneer, which proved to be a major commercial success and was the third highest-grossing Pakistani film of 2019.

Sami was appointed as a CLF Goodwill Ambassador by the Children's Literature Festival on July 30, 2019 in Pakistan.

Filmography

Films

Television

Other appearances

Awards

References

External links
 
 
 
 

Living people
Pakistani male television actors
Pakistani male models
Pakistani male film actors
Pashtun people
1980 births
University of Engineering and Technology, Lahore alumni
PTV Award winners
People from Lahore